Al-Iskan Sport Club, is an Iraqi football team based in Baghdad, that plays in the Iraq Division Three.

Managerial history
 Bashar Muwaishi
 Jafar Salih
 Mohammed Hussein Jumaah

Famous players
Alaa Abbas

See also
 2016–17 Iraq FA Cup
 2020–21 Iraq FA Cup

References

External links
 Al-Iskan SC on Goalzz.com
 Iraq Clubs- Foundation Dates

2011 establishments in Iraq
Association football clubs established in 2011
Football clubs in Baghdad